Don Cesar, Count of Irun (German: Don Cäsar, Graf von Irun) is a 1918 Austrian silent historical film directed by Jacob Fleck and Luise Fleck and starring Max Neufeld, Grit Haid and Karl Ehmann. It is based on the opera Don César de Bazan by Philippe Dumanoir and Adolphe d'Ennery, based on an earlier work by Victor Hugo. It was made and released during the closing stages of the First World War.

Cast
 Max Neufeld as Don Cäsar 
 Grit Haid 
 Karl Ehmann as König 
 Rosa Günther as Queen 
 Egon Brecher as Don Jose
 Eduard Sekler as Lazarillo

References

Bibliography
 Robert Von Dassanowsky. Austrian Cinema: A History. McFarland, 2005.

External links

Austro-Hungarian films
1918 films
Austrian silent feature films
Austrian historical films
Films directed by Jacob Fleck
Films directed by Luise Fleck
Austrian black-and-white films
1910s historical films
Films based on works by Victor Hugo
Austrian films based on plays
Films set in the 17th century
Films set in Spain